The Kawanishi E7K was a Japanese three-seat reconnaissance seaplane mainly in use during the 1930s. It was allocated the reporting name Alf by the Allies of World War II.

Design and development
In 1932 the Imperial Japanese Navy requested the Kawanishi Aircraft Company produce a replacement for the company's Kawanishi E5K. The resulting design, designated the Kawanishi E7K1, was an equal span biplane powered by a 462 kW (620 hp) Hiro Type 91 W-12 liquid-cooled inline engine. The first aircraft flew on 6 February 1933 and was handed over to the navy for trials three months later. It was flown in competition with the Aichi AB-6 which was designed to meet the same 7-Shi requirement. The E7K1 was ordered into production as the Navy Type 94 Reconnaissance Seaplane and entered service in early 1935. It became a popular aircraft, but was hindered by the unreliability of the Hiro engine. Later production E7K1s were fitted with a more powerful version of the Hiro 91, but this did not improve the reliability. In 1938 Kawanishi developed an improved E7K2 with a Mitsubishi Zuisei 11 radial engine, it first flew in August 1938 and was ordered by the Navy as the Navy Type 94 Reconnaissance Seaplane Model 2. The earlier E7K1 was renamed to Navy Type 94 Reconnaissance Seaplane Model 1.

Operational history

The type was used extensively by the Japanese Navy from 1938 until the beginning of the Pacific War, when E7K1 were relegated to second-line duties. The E7K2 continued in front-line service until 1943 and both versions were used in kamikaze operations during the closing stages of the war.

Variants
 E7K1
Production version with a Hiro Type 91 520 hp water-cooled W-12 engine, 183 built (including 57 built by Nippon Hikoki K.K.)
 E7K2
Re-engined version with a Mitsubishi Zuisei 11 radial engine, about 350 built (including 60 built by Nippon Hikoki K.K.)

Operators

 Imperial Japanese Navy Air Service

Specifications (E7K2)

See also

References

Notes

Bibliography

  (new edition 1987 by Putnam Aeronautical Books, .)
 
 Unknown Author. The Illustrated Encyclopedia of Aircraft (Part Work 1982-1985). Orbis Publishing, 1982–1985.

E07K, Kawanishi
Floatplanes
E07
Single-engined tractor aircraft
Biplanes
Aircraft first flown in 1933